The 1992–93 Danish Cup was the 39th installment of the Danish Cup, the highest football competition in Denmark.

Final

References

1992-93
1992–93 domestic association football cups
Cup